The Type 073 landing ship is a family of landing ships developed and operated by the People's Liberation Army Navy, it consists of several models. This article details the development of this class that begun in the 1960s. The most recent and modern model of the class is the Type 073A, which were built and commissioned in the 2000s.

Type 073 Yudao-class landing ship

Requirement of the Type 073-class landing ship was finalized in May 1965, and design work by Shanghai-based 708th Research Institute completed just 4 months later in September 1965. Preparation to build this class was completed in October 1966, and construction begun a month later in November 1966.  Due to political turmoil in China at the time, namely, Cultural Revolution, it was not until almost three years later in August 1969 when the ship was launched. From November 1969 thru December 1969, extensive trials were conducted and the ship was handed over to PLAN in December 1969 for further tests. In 1970 more tests were conducted with more than  logged, and the longest trip was from Chongqing to Dalian.

However, trials revealed that the vibration was too great at high speed, and the Type 073 did not enter production. Redesign work designated as Type 073II immediately started after the trials of the first unit ended, and the first unit entered PLAN service with pennant number 904 and was subsequently designated as Type 073I, and was later ordered to be fully converted to Type 073II standard.  Due to the political turmoil at the time, conversion was not completed until 1975.

Type 073II Yudao-class landing ship

Shortcomings of Type 073I exposed in trials caused a crush program to rework and redesign at Dalian Shipyard, but due to political turmoil in China at the time, it was not sufficient to correct the problem completely.  Shipyard # 9308 in Anhui petitioned the 6th Machinery Industrial Ministry and Anhui provincial Defense Industrial Office to construct Type 73II LSM in 1975, which was approved in April 1976, with orders for 3 ships.  Construction of the first Type 073II LSM at Shipyard # 9308 begun five months later in September 1976, and it was launched in June 1978. From 1978 to 1979, extensive trials were conducted and the ship was handed over to PLAN in early 1980, with pennant number East Transport 757 (East Transport = Dong Yun 东运 in Chinese), meaning Transport 757 of East Sea Fleet of PLAN.  This unit was later reassigned as # 937.

The primary difference between Type 073I and Type 073II is in the engine.  Additional balance weight was added to the diesel engine which solved the vibration problem, but the reliability issue of the engine remain unsolved, and as a result, Type 073II did not enter mass production, just like its predecessor Type 073I.

Type 073IIY Yudao-class landing ship

As the mass production plan for Type 073II was cancelled due to reliability problem of its engine, Shipyard # 9308 begun to modify the remaining two units that were already being built, which was successfully completed in September 1985. The resulting type is Type 073IIY landing ship, with Y for Yun (运), meaning transport in Chinese. Type 073I, Type 073II, and Type 073IIY all received the NATO reporting name Yudao-class. A total of two units of Type 073IIY were completed, with pennant #s 937 and 938.  The primary difference between Type 073II and Type 073 IIY includes more than 100 upgrades in addition to engine improvement.

Type 073III Yudeng-class landing ship

The reliability problem of the engine of Type 073 series was not completely solved until the appearance of Type 073III landing ship, with NATO reporting name Yudeng-class.  The D-39 engine that is reliable only at slower speed was replaced by a new engine that is reliable at all speeds, and displacement is also increased. Only one unit, the # 990 (Jinchengshan), entered service in 1991.

Type 073A Yunshu-class landing ship

After the completion of the first unit (pennant # 990), it takes a decade for more units to follow, and 10 more entered service between 2001 through 2002. These later units are slightly larger in displacement at 2,000 tons, and more advanced equipment, mainly in electronics and on board machinery. This latest batch is referred to as the Type 073A landing ship (NATO reporting name: Yunshu-class).

Pennant numbers; 941 (Shengshan), 942 (Lushan (鲁山)), 943 (Mengshan), 944 (Yushan), 945 (Huashan), 946 (Songshan), 947(Lushan (庐山)),  948(Xueshan), 949 (Hengshan), 950 (Taishan).

See also
List of active People's Liberation Army Navy ships

References

External links
PLA landing ships - historic and current (haijun360.com)

Amphibious warfare vessel classes
Amphibious warfare vessels of the People's Liberation Army Navy